The Bridegroom is a collection of twelve short stories by Chinese-American author Ha Jin. The stories are set in Muji City in contemporary China, the same provincial city that served as the setting for his novel Waiting.

Contents

"Saboteur," "The Bridegroom," and "After Cowboy Chicken Came to Town" were subsequently included in The Best American Short Stories series.

References

External links
New York Times review
The Bridegroom by Ha Jin - Powell's Books

American short story collections
2000 short story collections
Short story collections by Ha Jin
Short stories set in China
Pantheon Books books